Lucca is an unincorporated community in Barnes County, North Dakota, United States. The community was probably named after Pauline Lucca, an opera singer, although there is a claim it was named for Lucca, a city in Tuscany, Italy.

References

Unincorporated communities in Barnes County, North Dakota
Unincorporated communities in North Dakota